Hypareva pogonoda is a moth of the subfamily Arctiinae. It was described by George Hampson in 1900. It is found in Mexico, Guatemala, Panama and French Guiana.

References

 

Lithosiini
Moths described in 1900